This is a list of airports in Saskatchewan. It includes all Nav Canada certified and registered water and land airports, aerodromes and heliports in the Canadian province of Saskatchewan.



List of airports and heliports 

The list is sorted by the name of the community served; click the sort buttons in the table header to switch listing order.

Defunct airports

See also 
Transport in Saskatchewan
List of defunct airports in Canada

References 

 
Saskatchewan
Airports